The following is a complete chronology of the various line-ups of alternative rock music group Camper Van Beethoven. Camper Van Beethoven (originally called "Camper Van Beethoven and the Border Patrol,") formed in 1983 in Redlands, California, before relocating to Santa Cruz, California in 1984 and San Francisco, California in 1988. Prior to Camper Van Beethoven, band members David Lowery, Chris Molla, Victor Krummenacher and Bill McDonald played in several similarly conceived groups, with names like the Estonian Gauchos and Sitting Duck, that performed songs later found in the Camper Van Beethoven repertoire. Other members of these groups included Johnny Hickman and Eric Laing.

Camper Van Beethoven were inactive between late 1990 and 1999. Since reforming at this time, their lineup has been loosely defined, with several members acting as occasional or part-time collaborators, although the lineup has solidified around the five constant members in recent years.

References

Camper Van Beethoven